Charles Paul Simmons (August 17, 1924 – June 1, 2017) was an American editor and novelist. His first novel, Powdered Eggs (1964), was awarded the William Faulkner Foundation Award (1965) for a notable first novel. Later works include Salt Water (1998), The Belles Lettres Papers, and Wrinkles and co-author together with Alexander Coleman of All There is to Know: Readings From the Illustrious Eleventh Edition of the  Britannica.

He was formerly an editor of The New York Times Book Review. Simmons graduated from Regis High School and then Columbia University in 1948.

Selected works 

 Simmons, Charles (1973). Powdered Eggs. Penguin Books. 
 Simmons, Charles (1975). Your Subconscious Power. Wilshire Book Company. 
 Simmons, Charles (1978). Wrinkles. Farrar, Straus & Giroux. 
 Simmons, Charles (1979). Rides. Ramsay. 
 Simmons, Charles (1987). The Belles Lettres Papers. William Morrow. 
 Simmons, Charles (1988). An Old-fashioned Darling. Penguin Books. 
 Coleman, Alexander (Editor); Simmons, Charles (Editor). (1994). All There Is to Know: Readings From the Illustrious Eleventh Edition of the  Britannica. Simon & Schuster. 
 Simmons, Charles (1999). Salt Water. Gallery Books.

References

Notes

Citations

1924 births
2017 deaths
American non-fiction writers
American children's writers
Columbia College (New York) alumni